The Ministry of Public Order and Safety (MPOS), is the regional executive department of the Bangsamoro Autonomous Region in Muslim Mindanao (BARMM) responsible for affairs relating to the public order and security in the region. The ministry also deals with disaster management in Bangsamoro.

The MPOS did not have a counterpart office from the Autonomous Region in Muslim Mindanao (ARMM), the predecessor autonomous region of Bangsamoro. Some of Bangsamoro's ministries were reorganized from the regional offices of national government bodies in the ARMM.

The first Minister of Public Order and Safety is Hussein P. Muñoz who was appointed by Murad Ebrahim on February 26, 2019.

Ministers

References

Public Order and Safety